"(Dance with the) Guitar Man" is a song written by Duane Eddy and Lee Hazlewood and performed by Eddy, featuring vocals by The Blossoms (as The Rebelettes). The song was produced by Lee Hazlewood.  It was arranged by Anita Kerr.
The song appeared on his 1962 album, Dance with the Guitar Man  .  It was recorded at the RCA Nashville Sound Studio in Nashville, Tennessee.

Chart performance
"Dance with the Guitar Man" song reached #4 on the UK Singles Chart, #12 on the Billboard Hot 100, and #3 in Norway in 1962.

Other Versions
The Tremeloes released a version of the song in 1963.

References

1962 songs
1962 singles
Songs written by Duane Eddy
Songs written by Lee Hazlewood
Duane Eddy songs
Song recordings produced by Lee Hazlewood
RCA Victor singles